Beyond Recognition is the third full-length album (and final until 2009's The Prophecy) by American thrash metal band Defiance, released in 1992 on Roadrunner Records. It was a bit of a departure from the band's previous work. It can be best described as "progressive thrash metal", featuring more complex song structures, odd time signatures, numerous key and tempo changes, technical riffs and drumming, and even clean sections that often evoked jazz fusion. This newer, more distinctive style earned the band their biggest critical success to date, and many fans hail it as their finest work.

Despite this, the album did not sell as well as their previous works due to a shifting musical landscape and as a result, poor advertisement for the album. It has been out of print for many years, though many thrash fans consider it to be a lost gem of the genre.

During the recording of Beyond Recognition, vocalist Steev Esquivel temporarily left the band due to lack of focus due to drug addiction. He came back later when the band was not satisfied with their replacement vocalist. All of the tracks on the album still had Esquivel on lead vocals.

Former Heathen vocalist Dave White makes a guest appearance on "Inside looking Out", doing a vocal harmony with Esquivel during the chorus line. Ed Repka also did the cover art.

Track listing 
Killing Floor (03:45)
Step Back (05:01)
Perfect Nothing (05:38)
No Compromise (04:14)
Dead Silence (04:10)
Inside Looking Out (05:19)
The Chosen (04:16)
Powertrip (04:22)
Promised Afterlife (4:50)

Lineup 
Steev Esquivel – lead vocals
Doug Harrington – guitars
Jim Adams – guitars
Mike Kaufmann – bass
Matt Vander Ende – drums
Dave White – backing vocals on "Inside Looking Out"

References 

1992 albums
Defiance (band) albums
Roadrunner Records albums
Albums with cover art by Ed Repka